Jankowicz is a surname. Notable people with the surname include: 

Jan Jankowicz (1932–2019), Polish gymnast
Nina Jankowicz (born 1988/1989), American researcher, author, and commentator specializing in disinformation

See also
Janowicz

Polish-language surnames